Acceleration, in physics, is the rate at which the velocity of a body changes over time.

Acceleration may also refer to:
 Acceleration (biology), the speeding up of some part of embryonic development, a form of heterochrony
 Acceleration (differential geometry), the rate of change of velocity of a curve with respect to a given linear connection
 Acceleration (human), in developmental biology
 Acceleration (law), a shortening of the time period in which something is to take place
 Academic acceleration, the rapid advancement of students
 Accelerating change, the exponential nature of the rate of technological change in recent history
 Cardiotocographic acceleration, an apparent abrupt increase in fetal heart rate
 Vehicular acceleration, usually controlled by a throttle such as an accelerator pedal in a car
 The sensation of a change in speed
 Series acceleration, in mathematics, a sequence transformation for improving the rate of convergence of a series
 Acceleration (album)
 Acceleration (film), 2019 American action film 
 Accelerationism, critical and social theory

See also 
Accelerate (disambiguation)
Accelerator (disambiguation)